An independent telephone company was a telephone company providing local service in the United States or Canada that was not part of the Bell System organized by American Telephone and Telegraph. Independent telephone companies usually operated in many rural or sparsely populated areas.

United States 

The second fundamental Bell patent for telephones expired on 30 January 1894, which provided an opportunity for independent companies to provide telephone services, although some had been established before that date. The Strowger Automatic Telephone Exchange company had been formed on 30 October 1891. The first Strowger switch went into operation on 3 November 1892 in LaPorte, Indiana, with 75 subscribers and capacity for 99. Independent manufacturing companies were established, such as Stromberg-Carlson in 1894 and Kellogg Switchboard & Supply Company in 1897.

By 1903 while the Bell system had 1,278,000 subscribers on 1,514 main exchanges, the independents, excluding non-profit rural cooperatives, claimed about 2 million subscribers on 6,150 exchanges.

The size ranged from small mom and pop companies run by a husband and wife team, to large independent companies, such as GTE, Theodore Gary & Company, United Telecom, ConTel and Centel, which resembled the Bell system with vertical integration. GTE was the largest non-RBOC domestic telephone company, and included local operating companies, long line (toll) companies and manufacturing companies. A small mom and pop company might have had the husband doing the outside lines work and the wife operating a manual switchboard. Later these small companies would have a Class 5 telephone switch providing local automatic service. Much of this equipment was manufactured by the Automatic Electric Company, Stromberg-Carlson, and the Kellogg Switchboard & Supply Company.

From 1949, the Rural Electrification Authority (REA), now the Rural Utilities Service, could provide assistance to telephone co-operatives to extend telephone service in rural areas.

The voice of the smaller independents were the two magazines, Telephony and Telephone Engineer and Management (TE&M), both from Chicago. The United States Independent Telephone Association (USITA), their trade association, became the United States Telecom Association.

Bryant Pond in Woodstock, Maine was known as having the last manual magneto (hand-crank) telephone exchange in America. The family-owned Bryant Pond Telephone Company was operated from a two-position magneto switchboard in the living room of owners Barbara and Elden Hathaway. In 1981, the company was purchased by the Oxford County Telephone & Telegraph Company, a nearby larger independent company, and automatic service was provided in 1983.

Canada 

In Canada, Bell Canada has a dominant position as a local service provider, particularly east of Manitoba and in the Northern territories, mostly through subsidiaries in Ontario and Quebec, and entirely through subsidiaries beyond those two provinces.  The remaining independent telephone companies are in British Columbia (just one), Ontario and Quebec; all but three independents in Alberta, Saskatchewan, Manitoba, the Atlantic provinces and the northern territories were acquired by dominant provincial carriers by the 1970s, leaving some 55 independents mostly in Ontario.  The dominant provincial carriers were  Alberta Government Telephones  (AGT),  BC Tel  ,  Manitoba Telephone System, New Brunswick Telephone Co. (Bell subsidiary since the 1960s), Newfoundland Telephone (Bell subsidiary since the 1960s), Maritime Telegraph & Telephone (Nova Scotia), Island Tel (P.E.I.) and  SaskTel  .  Bell and the eight provincial carriers participated in the Trans-Canada Telephone System, later known as Telecom Canada.  Northwestel was the largest independent by land area covered that was not included in Telecom Canada; other large independents, by customer share, were  Edmonton Telephones  and  Thunder Bay Telephone 

More restructuring, mergers and acquisitions, and the introduction of competition and mergers between competitors and some provincial carriers, resulted in the disappearance of Telecom Canada; "independent" is no longer distinguished as a formal alliance, but now as a comparison of size and share of ILEC lines.  By 2001, Bell Canada remained the dominant incumbent LEC carrier in Ontario and urban areas of Quebec; Telus dominated in Alberta and B.C., Aliant Telecom encompassed all four Atlantic provinces plus former Bell areas in rural Ontario and Quebec; SaskTel remains a distinct provincial carrier; MTS encompasses Manitoba's former provincial company (Bell Canada purchased MTS in 2017; it is currently known as Bell MTS).  Telus and Bell are competitors in each other's territory.  There are still some independent companies in Ontario and Quebec, and one in British Columbia.

See also
List of United States telephone companies 
List of Canadian telephone companies 
Canadian Independent Telephone Association

References

External links
Bryant Pond Telephone Company
TE&M changes name
Stories from independent telco workers

History of telecommunications in the United States
1894 in the United States